Adnan Jafar (born 29 December 1949) is a former Iraqi footballer  who played for Iraq in the 1978 Asian Games. He played for the national team in 1978.

References

1949 births
Iraqi footballers
Iraq international footballers
Al-Shorta SC players
Al-Shorta SC managers
Footballers at the 1978 Asian Games
Living people
Iraqi football managers
Asian Games competitors for Iraq
Association footballers not categorized by position